was a Japanese chemist. He is known for being the first to isolate epinephrine in 1901.

Early life and education
Takamine was born in Takaoka, Toyama Prefecture, in November 1854. His father was a doctor; his mother a member of a family of sake brewers. He spent his childhood in Kanazawa, capital of present-day Ishikawa Prefecture in central Honshū, and was educated in Osaka, Kyoto, and Tokyo, graduating from the Tokyo Imperial University in 1879. He did postgraduate work at University of Glasgow and Anderson College in Scotland. He returned to Japan in 1883 and joined the division of chemistry at the newly established Department of Agriculture and Commerce. He learned English as a child from a Dutch family in Nagasaki and so always spoke English with a Dutch accent.

While in the US, Takamine was married to Caroline Field Hitch.

Career

Japan
Takamine continued to work for the department of agriculture and commerce until 1887. He then founded the Tokyo Artificial Fertilizer Company, where he later isolated the enzyme takadiastase, an enzyme that catalyzes the breakdown of starch. Takamine developed his diastase from koji, a fungus used in the manufacture of soy sauce and miso. Its Latin name is Aspergillus oryzae, and it is a "designated national fungus" (kokkin) in Japan.

In 1899, Takamine was awarded an honorary Doctorate in Engineering by what is now the University of Tokyo.

United States

Takamine went as co-commissioner of the Cotton Exposition to New Orleans in 1884, where he met Lafcadio Hearn and Caroline Hitch, his future wife. He later emigrated to the United States and established his own research laboratory in New York City but licensed the exclusive production rights for Taka-diastase to one of the largest US pharmaceutical companies, Parke-Davis. This turned out to be a shrewd move -  he became a millionaire in a relatively short time and by the early 20th century was estimated to be worth $30 million.

In 1901 he isolated and purified the hormone adrenaline (the first effective bronchodilator for asthma) from animal glands, becoming the first to accomplish this for a glandular hormone. In 1894, Takamine applied for, and was granted, a patent titled "Process of Making Diastatic Enzyme"—the first patent on a microbial enzyme in the United States.

In 1905 he founded the Nippon Club, which was for many years located at 161 West 93rd Street in Manhattan.

Takamine devoted his life to maintaining goodwill between the U.S. and Japan.

Many of the beautiful cherry blossom trees in the West Potomac Park surrounding the Tidal Basin in Washington, DC were donated by the mayor of Tokyo (Yukio Ozaki) and Jokichi Takamine in 1912.

The 1915 photo to the right presents Jōkichi Takamine as the host for a banquet honoring the visiting Japanese diplomat Baron Eiichi Shibusawa. This illustration is linked to Jōkichi Takamine's involvement in the gifting of the cherry blossom trees to Washington, D.C. in 1912, which has evolved into the National Cherry Blossom Festival which is celebrated yearly.

In 1904, the Emperor Meiji of Japan honored Takamine with an unusual gift. In the context of the St. Louis World Fair (Louisiana Purchase Exposition), the Japanese government had replicated a historical Japanese structure, the "Pine and Maple Palace" (Shofu-den), modelled after the Kyoto Imperial Coronation Palace of 1,300 years ago. This structure was given to Dr. Takamine in grateful recognition of his efforts to further friendly relations between Japan and the United States.  He had the structure transported in sections from Missouri to his summer home in upstate New York, seventy-five miles north of New York City. In 1909, the structure served as a guest house for Prince Kuni Kuniyoshi and Princess Kuni of Japan, who were visiting the area.  Although the property was sold in 1922, the reconstructed structure remained in its serene setting. In 2008, it still continues to be one of the undervalued tourist attractions of New York's Sullivan County.

The Takamine home in Kanazawa can still be seen today. It was relocated to near the grounds of Kanazawa Castle in 2001.

On April 18, 1985, the Japan Patent Office selected him as one of Ten Japanese Great Inventors.

Depiction in film
Two films about the life of Takamine have been made. A sequel titled Takamine, also directed by Ichikawa and starring Hatsunori Hasegawa, was released in 2011.

See also
National Cherry Blossom Festival

References

General
 Biographical snapshots: Jokichi Takamine, Journal of Chemical Education web site.
 Hajime Hoshi. (1904).  Handbook of Japan and Japanese Exhibits at World's Fair, St. Louis, 1904. St. Louis: Woodward and Tiernan Printing Co..

Further reading
 ''Final Report of the Louisiana Purchase Exposition Commission: Japan's participation

External links
   — Dr. Jokichi Takamine: Japanese father of American Biotechnology.
  — Production of Microbial Enzymes and Their Applications.
 History of Industrial Property Right, Jokichi Takamine Taka-Disatase, Adrenaline, Japan patent Office.
 Radio program about the ‘father of American biotechnology’ who was never allowed to become an American citizen. 

1854 births
1922 deaths
Japanese inventors
Japanese scientists
20th-century Japanese chemists
Japanese expatriates in the United Kingdom
Japanese expatriates in the United States
People from Kanazawa, Ishikawa
People from Toyama Prefecture
Japanese emigrants to the United States
University of Tokyo alumni
Riken personnel
Daiichi Sankyo people
Burials at Woodlawn Cemetery (Bronx, New York)
19th-century Japanese chemists